NOS (Network Operating System) is a discontinued operating system with time-sharing capabilities, written by Control Data Corporation in 1975.

NOS ran on the 60-bit CDC 6000 series of mainframe computers and their successors. NOS replaced the earlier CDC Kronos operating system of the 1970s. NOS was intended to be the sole operating system for all CDC machines, a fact CDC promoted heavily. NOS was replaced with NOS/VE on the 64-bit Cyber-180 systems in the mid-1980s.

Version 1 of NOS continued to be updated until about 1981; NOS version 2 was released early 1982.

Time-sharing commands
 ACCESS – selects the access subsystem
 APL – selects APL programing language
 ASCII – select fill 128-character ASCII
 ATTACH – links to a permanent file
 AUTO – automatically generate five-digit line numbers
 BASIC – selects BASIC system
 BATCH – selects the batch system
 BEGIN – starts processing of CCL procedure (control language file)
 BINARY – selects binary input mode
 BRIEF – suppresses headers
 BYE – log off the system
 CALL – starts processing KCL procedure file (control language before CCL)
 CATLIST – lists user's permanent files
 CHANGE – changes parameters of a permanent file
 CHARGE – set charge number and project number
 CLEAR – releases all local files
 CONVERT – converts character sets
 (CR) – Carriage Return – requests terminal status if it is the first thing on a line
 CSET – selects the terminal character-set mode
 DAYFILE – lists a record of the user's activity
 DEBUG – activates or terminates CYBER interactive Debug
 DEFINE – create a direct-access permanent file
 DIAL – sends a one-line message to another terminal
 EDIT – Selects the text editor
 ENQUIRE – Requests the current job status
 EXECUTE – selects the Execute subsystem
 FORTRAN – selects the FORTRAN subsystem (FORTRAN 5)
 FTNTS – Selects the FORTRAN Extended Version 4 compiler (CDC's enhanced version of FORTRAN 4)
 FULL – Selects full-duplex mode
 GET – gets a copy of a permanent file
 GOODBYE – same as BYE
 HALF – clears full-duplex mode
 HELLO – logs out and starts login
 HELP – gets descriptions of NOS commands
 LENGTH – requests the length of a file
 LIB – get a copy of a permanent file
 LIMITS – lists the user's limits
 LIST – lists the contents of a file
 LNH – same as LIST except no headers
 LOGIN – same as HELLO
 LOGOUT – same as BYE
 MONITOR – connects to a terminal
 NEW – creates a new primary file
 NORMAL – clears modes set by ASCII, AUTO, BRIEF, NOSORT, CSET, PARITY, and TAPE
 NOSORT – prevents the system from sorting the primary file on the subsequent command
 NULL – selects the null subsystem.
 OLD – gets a copy of a permanent file
 P – proceed
 PACK – compress a file with several logical records into one logical record
 PACKNAM – direct subsequent file requests to an auxiliary device
 PARITY – set terminal parity
 PASSWOR – change user password
 PERMIT – grants another user permission to access a file
 PRIMARY – makes temporary file the new primary file
 PURGE – removes permanent files
 RECOVER – allows user to resume after terminal was disconnected
 RENAME – changes file name
 REPLACE – replace the contents of a permanent file with a temporary file
 RESEQ – resequece or add line numbers to the primary file
 SAVE – save a file permanently
 SETASL – sets SRU account block limit (SRU = System Resurce Unit, on hard drive)
 SETTL – set CPU time limit
 SORT – sort the primary file
 STATUS – same as ENQUIRE
 STOP – terminates currently running programs
 SUBMIT – submit a batch job deck image
 TRAN – select NOS transaction subsystem
 USER – get terminal number
 X – process a time-sharing command as a batch command
 XEDIT – select XEDIT editor

From NOS Version 1 Terminal User's Instant Manual, CDC, 1975-1980.

See also 

 CDC Kronos
 CDC SCOPE
 CDC display code

References 

NOS
Discontinued operating systems
Time-sharing operating systems